Philippe Pijollet (1940-November 17, 2006) was a French English professor who served as the Director of Adult Resources of the World Scout Bureau, and was also in charge of African issues.

In 2002, Pijollet was awarded the 293rd Bronze Wolf, the only distinction of the World Organization of the Scout Movement, awarded by the World Scout Committee for exceptional services to world Scouting.

References

External links

Recipients of the Bronze Wolf Award
1940 births
Scouting and Guiding in France
2006 deaths